The Truth Shall Not Sink with Sewol (lit. Diving Bell) is a South Korean documentary film about the sinking of the MV Sewol, directed by Lee Sang-ho (journalist) and Ahn Hae-ryong.
The documentary draws back the curtain on one of the most controversial parts of modern Korean history, the aftermath of the sinking of the MV Sewol, which resulted in the loss of 304 people. Through a variety of news reports and eyewitness testimonies, directors Sang-ho Lee (“Journalist Lee”) and Hae-ryong Ahn show how the large South Korean media companies colluded with the government over the information about the sinking of the ferry. He highlights the suffering of the victims’ families, their quest to discover the cause of the accident, and the truth behind the government’s behavior during and after it. The documentary focuses on the use of a diving bell, a piece of equipment that allows divers to stay underwater for long periods of time. Lee draws the conclusion that precious rescue time was wasted by government authorities.

Opening Scene 
The beginning of the documentary opens with footage of the sinking Sewol ferry and a voiceover from some of the students on board. The students are aware that the ship is sinking, and that there are hundreds of people still within. The mainstream media announced that about two hours after the reporting of the ship’s distress, all of the passengers of the Sewol had been rescued.

The Truth Begins to Come Out 
The documentary provides a voiceover of a phone call to the Blue House (South Korea’s presidential quarters). During the call, the caller indicates that only 166 people have been accounted for. The person who answers the call says that is a shame, because it was already reported that everyone had been rescued.
News reports now indicate that the earlier announcements about everyone being rescued were not entirely correct. One report mentions that the parents of the students on board were able to talk to their children for only 30 minutes after the accident before losing all communication.

Reactions to the Announcement  
Park Geun-hye, the current president, appears before a crowd to promise that there will be an investigation and those responsible for the accident will be punished. Kim Suk-kyoon, Commissioner of the Korean Coast Guard, says that 550 people are searching for survivors. 
The film highlights the dismay and confusion of the people listening to the government officials. This feeling turns into anger when families notice that what is being reported is not actually what is occurring at the accident site.
Later, at a night gathering of the victims’ families, Sang-ho Lee (referred to hereafter in this entry as “Journalist Lee”) reports that some of the victims’ bodies were discovered. They had bruises on their faces, which seemed to indicate they died from hypothermia. 
Lee reports that he is the only journalist with the families, and asks who removed the other members of the press. The families begin to call for the media to take up their plea for action.

Reality vs Reporting 
The documentary begins to show examples of the false reports that appear in the mainstream Korean media. For example, KBS News indicated that a joint task force mobilized 640 divers, both civilian and military. It gave the impression that the divers were working diligently to dive the ship. However, Journalist Lee interviewed one of the divers at the port near the accident site. The civilian diver noted that the officials said the weather was getting worse so it wasn’t safe for divers. However, the diver disagreed and said they could dive. He also noted that some divers were taken out on a boat, but it was only for show. 
In another example, Yonhap News reported that there were hundreds of ships at the accident site and 900 flares launched. In the background, one of the victims’ family members sobs, saying that it wasn’t true.

Official Influence on the Major News Media Outlets 
Kim Si-gon, Chief of the KBS News Bureau, is quoted as saying that he received a call from the Blue House warning him to avoid any criticism of the Coast Guard.

The Coast Guard 
The attention in the film turns to the Coast Guard. Spokesman Ko Myung-suk indicates that the recovery efforts include civilian divers. When pressed on the matter, he says that the Coast Guard has a contract with Undine, a private company. At this point, an interview with Chang Byoung-soo, the Director of Undine Marine Industries, is briefly shown. He is discussing the challenges of attempting to rescue the people trapped inside the Sewol. He mentions that it is hard for a diver to operate in such conditions, even with training, and expecting teens with no diving experience to be able to be rescued in a dive situation is not appropriate.
Journalist Lee asks Kim Suk-kyoon, Commissioner of the Coast Guard, how divers can bring the trapped passengers up safely, since the Director of Undine said that it is impossible to do it. The commissioner says he does not understand the question, and doesn’t provide an answer.

The Need for a Diving Bell 
Lee Jong-in (referred to as “Specialist Lee”), owner of the company Alpha, is a rescue and salvage specialist. During an interview, he notes that a diving bell allows divers to work safely for 20 hours underwater. Such a place would also serve as a temporary sanctuary for the rescued passengers. The diving bell itself helps with decompression (diving), and eliminates the issues with diving in tidal currents. Video footage from the prior use of a diving bell shows a survivor in the air pocket inside a sunken ship at a depth of 30 meters in the Atlantic. The man was rescued after being under water three days.

Back and Forth 
Specialist Lee initially goes out to the port, at his own expense and with his own equipment, to help the Coast Guard. He is certain that his extensive experience in underwater operations will be an asset. However, a good portion of his time is spent getting told answers that are confusing to him. It doesn’t seem that the Coast Guard wants Specialist Lee’s expertise, but reports begin appearing about him in the media. Journalist Lee indicates that this is odd, since there were no reporters with either him or Specialist Lee at the time.
At one point in the film, Specialist Lee is told that if he anchors near the other barges near the sunken vessel, the lines could get tangled and break. He indicates that it would take years for such lines to break. Specialist Lee temporarily loses his composure, asking whether reputation is more important than life.
A diving bell appears at the port, but it is not as large as Specialist Lee’s and appears to have come from a college training program.

Activity at the Port 
Journalist Lee indicates there are now 100 plainclothes police officers at the port, mingling with the crowd. He is surprised to see this, and the crowd seems to be peaceful. 
Later, there is an interview with Ju-Young Lee, an official from the Ministry of Oceans and Fisheries, and Kim Suk-kyoon, Commissioner of the Coast Guard. They are surrounded by the victims’ family members. During this interview, the commissioner is contradicted by the crowd a few times, and finally relents and tells Specialist Lee to return to the port to assist with the recovery operation on Sewol. At this time, he promises to allow reporters and families on board to watch the operations.

The Actual Scenario After Specialist Lee Arrived 
Several mainstream news reports in South Korea call the use of the diving bell controversial before Specialist Lee deploys the unit. Unlike what was promised, the Coast Guard does not allow the press on board with Specialist Lee. Prior to his departure, Journalist Lee shows Specialist Lee a schematic of Sewol and pictures of the children on his phone to help him understand where they might be found on the ship. 
At this point, Specialist Lee is surrounded by plainclothes police, who speak quietly to him. 
When Specialist Lee arrives at the accident site, the Coast Guard refuses to let him anchor his barge. Later news reports would blame Specialist Lee for this refusal, but Lee indicated that the captain of the ship he was on was openly threatened by the Coast Guard.
Specialist Lee tries to go again, and this time, he successfully anchors his barge in 5 minutes.

Diving the Sewol 
The Coast Guard directs Specialist Lee to a certain part of the sunken ship. The divers search all night for the entrance to the ferry’s stern, but never locate it. It is revealed that the Coast Guard sent Specialist Lee and his team to the wrong part of the Sewol, incorrectly telling him he was diving the stern of the ship.
Media reports said that Specialist Lee failed again, making it appear that the owner of Alpha had been partly responsible for the failed rescue.

Sabotage 
When Specialist Lee attempts to deploy the diving bell, it fills with water. During an inspection of the equipment, he finds that one of the lines was cut to damage the equipment. After replacing the hose, he attempts the dive with the bell.

Diving Conditions 
The Alpha divers struggle in the cold, murky waters. The range of vision is about 0.5 m, and they descend 23 meters.

“Attempted Murder” 
During the dive, while the diving bell is still under water, a Coast Guard boat suddenly rushes towards the diving bell and Specialist Lee's barge. The divers are still undergoing decompression inside the diving bell. The reason for the Coast Guard’s rush was to take the head of the security bureau from Specialist Lee’s barge for a morning report. Specialist Lee indicates that this dangerous maneuver could have killed all of the men inside the diving bell.

Average Dive Times 
The documentary shows the average dive times for comparison:
Coast guard 11 minutes
Navy 26 minutes
Civilian divers 33 minutes
Diving bell divers 1 hour 57 minutes

After the Dive
Volunteer divers share positive feedback about using the diving bell as it allows them to stay underwater for long periods without impacting them physically.  
Specialist Lee prepares for the next deployment of the diving bell with divers from the Coast Guard.  However, this doesn’t happen and Specialist Lee is asked to remove his vessel from the accident site.  
The media report Specialist Lee’s diving bell was deployed, but came up after 50 minutes, failing to retrieve any victims.  In addition, the media also say that family representatives stated that the diving bell delayed rescue operations, and that Specialist Lee voluntarily withdrew operations before he even spoke to them.  
Specialist Lee indicates that he was instructed to state that the diving bell was a failure as no one was rescued.  He meets with the media and addresses some of their questions.  
Conservative civic organizations accuse Specialist Lee, JTBC anchorman Sohn Suk-hee, and Journalist Lee of exaggerating the effectiveness of the diving bell and disrupting rescue operations.  
The documentary ends with scenes from marches and protests where parents, students, and others ask for the truth about the Sewol Ferry incident.  Journalist Lee interviews a father whose son was on the ferry. The father shares that he just wants to know why those on board were not rescued.

Controversy and the Blacklisting of Korean Media Personalities  
After its completion, The Truth Shall Not Sink With Sewol (Diving Bell, 2014) was scheduled to screen at the 2014 Busan International Film Festival. However, at the time, the government sought to restrict portrayals of the Sewol Ferry disaster within the media. Therefore, the chairman of the festival, Suh Byung-soo (also mayor of Busan at the time) requested that the organizers not screen the film. The organizers resisted the pressure and screened the documentary. This resulted in the film festival budget being slashed by over 50% over the following two years.  
The budget cut created a backlash due to news of the state trying to influence the film festival. Many filmmakers boycotted the event, which almost shut down the film festival. 
While the blacklisting of artists for their work is not new in South Korea, in 2018, the full extent of Park Geun-hye’s blacklist was revealed. Her list included 9,473 artists who were deemed to be ineligible for government support. These artists included those who opposed the government handling and orders surrounding the Sewol Ferry disaster; those who signed a statement calling for the government to take responsibility for the Sewol Ferry disaster; and artists who supported opposing candidates to Park’s administration . This blacklist was discarded after Moon Jae-in became president. As a result, many productions were released, such as the 2018 documentary Intention (Geunal, Bada, 2018) which investigates the cause of the Sewol Ferry sinking.

Awards and recognition 
The Truth Shall Not Sink With Sewol (Diving Bell, 2014)  won the Grand Prize at the Fukuoka Asian Film Festival in 2015.

Reactions 
 
Joshua Oppenheimer, a film director, was struck by the "incredibly incompetent rescue mission" depicted in the documentary and after viewing the film began to question the role of media in South Korea and the rest of the world.

References

External links 
  
 
 
 

2014 films
2010s Korean-language films
South Korean documentary films
Documentary films about maritime disasters
Documentary films about MV Sewol
2014 documentary films
Films directed by Ahn Hae-ryong
2010s South Korean films